Alıç may refer to:

 Alıç, Gölpazarı, a village in the district of Gölpazarı, Bilecik Province, Turkey
 Alıç, Ilgaz
 Alıc, a village in Quba Rayon, Azerbaijan